Yury, Yuri, Youri, Yurii, Yuriy, Yurij, Iurii or Iouri is the Slavic (or , or , or ) form of the masculine given name George; it is derived directly from the Greek form Georgios and related to Polish Jerzy, Czech Jiří, and Slovak and Croatian Juraj, akin to Spanish and Portuguese Jorge, and German Jürgen, and assimilated in modern forms such as German and Italian Juri, Portuguese Iury, and Dutch Joeri.

The Slavic form of the name originates with Yuri Dolgoruky, Grand Prince of Kiev (c. 1099–1157), in early accounts recorded as Gyurgi, Dyurgi. Yaroslav the Wise, great-grandfather of Yuriy Dolgorukiy, was the first Ruthenian ruler whose patron saint was Saint George. The saint is now depicted on the coat of arms of Moscow.

Ancient and medieval world
(Listed chronologically)
 Yuri Dolgorukiy or Yuri I Vladimirovich (c. 1099–1157), Grand Prince of Kiev
 Yuri II of Vladimir (1189–1238), Grand Prince of Vladimir
 Yuriy Drohobych (1450–1494), Ruthenian philosopher, astrologist, writer, and doctor
 Yury Ivanovich (1480–1536), a son of Ivan the Great

Modern world

(Listed alphabetically)
 Yuri Andropov (1914–1984), Chairman of the KGB and leader of the Soviet Union
 Yuri Berchiche (born 1990), Spanish footballer
 Yuri Bezmenov (1939–1993), Soviet journalist and eventual anti-communist who defected to Canada
 Yuri Gagarin (1934–1968), Soviet cosmonaut and the first human in space
 Yury Gelman (born 1955), Ukrainian-born American Olympic fencing coach 
 Yurii Kerpatenko (1976–2022), Ukrainian conductor 
 Yuri Irsenovich Kim, birth name of Kim Jong-il (1941 or 1942–2011), Supreme Leader of North Korea
 Yuri Korolev (ice hockey) (born 1934), Soviet/Russian ice hockey administrator
 Yuri Korolyov, (born 1962) Russian gymnast
 Yuriy Kozhanov (born 1990), Kazakh basketball player
 Yuri Lowenthal (born 1971), American actor, producer and screenwriter best known for his voice-over work
 Yury Luzhkov (1936–2019), Russian politician
 Yuri Lyapkin (born 1945), Russian ice hockey player
 Yuri Nikulin (1921–1997), Soviet/Russian actor and clown
 Yuri Oganessian (born 1933), Russian nuclear physicist for whom Element 118 was named 
 Yury Prilukov (born 1984), Russian swimmer
 Yuriy Prylypko (1960-2022) Ukrainian politician and mayor of Hostomel. Killed by Russian soldiers during the invasion of Ukraine
 Yury Rudov (1931–2013), Soviet fencer
 Yuri Shchekochikhin (1950–2003), Russian investigative journalist, writer and liberal politician
 Yuri Schwebler (1942–1990), Yugoslavia-born American conceptual artist and sculptor
 Yuri Shevchuk (born 1957), Soviet/Russian rock musician, singer and songwriter
 Yuriy Trubetskoy (c. 1643–1679), Ruthenian prince
 Yury Usachov (born 1957), Russian retired cosmonaut
 Yuri Vizbor (1934–1984), Soviet bard, poet and actor
 Yuri Zhirkov (born 1983), Russian footballer

See also 
 
 
 Igor (given name)

References 

Russian masculine given names
Ukrainian masculine given names
Bulgarian masculine given names
Slovene masculine given names
Macedonian masculine given names